Lake Cheybek-Kohl (Çöybök-Köl, literally: "Long Lake") (or Dead lake) is in Altai Mountains and the Altai Republic, Russia. It is located in the upper reaches of the Chibit River, at elevation 1816 m. The lake is a natural phenomenon — it was formed by the damming of the river. It belongs to dam type of the lakes.

Because the lake has no fish, it is called Dead. The first theory was that mercury was in water. From this, Ivan Efremov wrote the story "Lake of Mountains' spirits". The Mercury content is normal, but there are still no fish in the lake, because they can't be lifted to the lake. Now Cheubek-Kohl rental, there are growing fish.

Sources 
 Т. Вдовина, Т. И. Злобина, О. Полунина Достопримечательности Горного Алтая. — Барнаул: Пять плюс, 2008. — 232 с. —  

Lakes of the Altai Republic